The Express & Echo is a paid-for newspaper for Exeter and the surrounding area.

History
The Express & Echo was established in 1904 as the result of a merger between the Western Echo and the Devon Evening Express, which was founded in 1864.

In 1909 it contained a column titled "Womanland" which dealt with various topics including suffrage protests. It was written by Exeter's first woman councillor (in time) Edith Splatt.

The paper was published on green-tinted newsprint until 1930. It switched from broadsheet to tabloid format in 1979.

It was published daily until September 2011, when it became a weekly newspaper. In 2012, Local World acquired previous owner Northcliffe Media from Daily Mail and General Trust.  Local World was subsequently acquired by Trinity Mirror.

From February 2015 the paper began publishing weekly on Thursdays.

References

Newspapers published in Devon
Mass media in Exeter
Publications established in 1904
Weekly newspapers published in the United Kingdom
Newspapers published by Reach plc